Siby is a village and rural commune in the Cercle of Kati in the Koulikoro Region of southern Mali. The commune contains 21 villages and in the 2009 census had a population of 26,632. The village lies 50 km southwest of the capital, Bamako, on the plain to the south of the Monts Mandingues. The RN5 road that links Bamako with Siguiri in Guinea runs through the village.

History 
The Mandé village of Siby was founded in the Middle Ages by ancestors of the Camara.

According to the Epic of Sundiata, the King of Siby, Kamandjan Kamara, whom Sundiata Keita knew from childhood, brought the kings of the tribes allied against Soumaoro Kanté, King of the Sosso, together at Siby.

The troops of Sundiata Keita had just won two battles against the Sossos at Negueboria in the Bouré and at Kangigné. In Siby, all the allied kings found themselves gathered around Sundiata Keita: Kamandjan Kamara, king of Siby, his cousin Tabon wana Fran Kamara, king of the Camara blacksmiths, Siara Kouman Diabaté, Faony Diarra Kondé, king of the country of Do, the country of Sogolon and the mother of Sundiata, Mansa Traoré. After a few days of rest, the allies went to Kirina where the decisive battle against Soumaoro Kanté took place.

On the top of the mountain, an arch, from where one has a splendid sight on the surrounding plain, is dug in the rock. According to legend, it was Kamandjan Kamara who transpierced the mountain with his sabre the day before the departure, during an evening where Balla
Fasséké asked each king present if he was able to do so.

References 

 Djibril Tamsir Niane, Soundjata ou l'épopée mandingue, Présence africaine, Paris, 1960.
 Résultats provisoires du Recensement général de la population et de l'habitat 2009 [archive] sur Institut national de la statistique (Mali), 2010. Consulté le 18 mars 2010

See also 
The city cooperates with Ramonville Saint Agne, France.

The first two editions of the Forum des peuples were held in Siby in 2002 and 2003.

Populated places in Koulikoro Region